Jaap Barendregt (10 January 1905 – 16 February 1952) was a Dutch football striker.

Club career
Barendregt played his whole career at Feijenoord and his total of 196 league goals is a club record, leading Kees Pijl and Cor van der Gijp. He played his first official game in 1925 against De Spartaan and his final one in 1937 against Go Ahead Eagles.

International career
Behind the legendary Beb Bakhuys in the national team pecking order, he only earned one cap for the Netherlands, a March 1929 friendly match against Switzerland.

Honours
 1927-28 : Eredivisie winner with Feijenoord
 1929-30 : KNVB Cup winner with Feijenoord
 1934-35 : KNVB Cup winner with Feijenoord
 1935-36 : Eredivisie winner with Feijenoord

References

External links
 Profile

1905 births
1952 deaths
Footballers from Rotterdam
Association football forwards
Dutch footballers
Netherlands international footballers
Feyenoord players